Southcentre Mall is one of the largest (by area) shopping malls in Calgary, Alberta, Canada, and contains approximately 190 stores and services over two floors.

It is located in the city's southeast quadrant at the intersection of Macleod Trail and Anderson Road, and across the street from the Anderson C-Train Station, in the neighbourhood of Willow Park. The mall is owned and operated by Oxford Properties.

History
Originally opened in October 1974, the mall was expanded in 1986. In 1988, further expansion added a two-level retail wing to the north side. In late 1999, the mall grew again to include a new 3-level department store (planned as Eaton's but ultimately opened as Sears), approximately 20 retailers, and a two-level parkade. The theatre complex was closed at this time and retrofitted into retail space. The most recent expansion was completed in 2009.

In 2012, it became the first mall to offer private visits with Santa Claus to children with autism.

In January 2018, Sears closed down following the company's bankruptcy. Soon after, Showhome Furniture opened in the ground floor space vacated by Sears, and closed as of November 2019. In July 2020, Oxford Properties announced that Dollarama, PetSmart, and Winners would open stores on the vacant ground floor space as part of an ongoing redevelopment project. Dollarama officially opened in November 2020, while PetSmart and Winners are scheduled to open in Spring 2021, with Winners opening on April 21.

See also 
 List of shopping malls in Canada
 Chinook Centre

References

External links

Shopping malls in Calgary
Shopping malls established in 1974
Oxford Properties
1974 establishments in Alberta